The Adelbach is a river in Baden-Württemberg, Germany. It flows into the Kocher near Rosengarten.

See also
List of rivers of Baden-Württemberg

Rivers of Baden-Württemberg
Limpurg Hills
Rivers of Germany